The 2017 Penrith Panthers season was the 51st in the club's history. Coached by Anthony Griffin and captained by Matt Moylan, the Panthers competed in the National Rugby League's 2017 Telstra Premiership. They also competed in the 2017 NRL Auckland Nines pre-season tournament, which they finished as runners-up.

Squad

Player transfers
A † denotes that the transfer occurred during the 2017 season.

Auckland Nines

With club executives Brian Fletcher and Phil Gould questioning the necessity of the tournament, and a number of players unavailable for selection due to recent representative commitments, the Panthers fielded a largely inexperienced squad at the 2017 NRL Auckland Nines on 4–5 February. 9 of the 18 squad members had no previous NRL experience and only 3 had played more than 30 NRL games. Regardless, the team won all 3 of their pool matches, and progressed to the Grand Final, where they were defeated 10–8 by the Sydney Roosters. Waqa Blake and Moses Leota were named in the team of the tournament.

Fixtures

Pre-season

Regular season

Finals

Statistics

Ladder

Other teams
In addition to competing in the National Rugby League, the Panthers also fielded semi-professional teams in the National Youth Competition's 2017 Holden Cup (Under-20s) and the New South Wales Rugby League's 2017 Intrust Super Premiership (NSW Cup). The NYC team was coached by Garth Brennan and captained by Wayde Egan, and the NSW Cup team was coached by David Tangata-Toa and captained by Sione Katoa in early rounds and Darren Nicholls in later rounds.

The club won the 2017 New South Wales Cup season and the 2017 NRL State Championship.

Finals

Representative honours

Domestic

International

References

Penrith Panthers seasons
Penrith Panthers season